Doukkala-Abda ( (Ǧihâtu Dukkālâ - ʿAbdâ)) was formerly one of the sixteen regions of Morocco from 1997 to 2015. It is situated in west-central Morocco. It covered an area of 13,285 km² and had a population of 2,173,090 (2014 census). The capital is Safi.

Administrative divisions
The region is made up into the following 4 provinces :

 El Jadida Province2
 Sidi Bennour Province1, 2
 Safi Province3
 Youssoufia Province1, 3

Notes
1 - The provinces of Sidi Bennour and Youssoufia were both created in 2009: Sidi Bennour by splitting El Jadida, and Youssoufia by splitting Safi.
2 - The provinces of El Jadida and Sidi Bennour correspond to the historic region of Doukkala; now part of the Casablanca-Settat Region as of September 2015.
3 - The provinces of Safi and Youssoufia correspond approximately to the historic region of Abda; now part of the Marrakesh-Safi Region as of September 2015.

Cities

 Jdida 
 Sidi Bennour 
 Azemour 
 Bir Jdid  
 Zmamra 
 Ouled Frej 
 Karia 
 Moulay Abdallah 
 Oualidia 
 Laaounate 
 Sidi Smaïl 
 Oulad Ghadbane 
 Sidi Ali Ben Hamdouche 
 Sebt Lamaarif 
 Oulad Amrane 
 Sidi Bouzid 
 Asfi 
 Youssoufia 
 Echemaia 
 Jmaat Shaim 
 Sebt Gzoula 
 Sidi Ahmed 
 Laakarta 
 Bouguedra 
 Ighoud 
 Ahrara

Features of the region

References

Former regions of Morocco